Old Bridge Township Raceway Park, originally known as Madison Township Raceway Park, is an American auto racing facility located in Old Bridge Township, in Middlesex County, New Jersey, United States, (with an Englishtown ZIP code).

History
Raceway Park was founded in 1965 by Vincent Napoliello and Louis Napoliello. The site was originally 308 acres on 230 Pension Road, just off of County Route 527 (now Englishtown Road). Since then it has grown to 500+ acres with multiple motorsports activities. The track opened with a single 1/4 mile dragstrip. Raceway Park offered two dragstrips, three motocross tracks, a  road course track, competition go kart racing track, autocross track, ride and drive site and adjacent Old Bridge Airport.

Their radio and television commercials featured the slogan: "Ah ha ha ha ha ha Raceway Park!" and "Rrrrrrrrraceway Park! ... Be there!". Raceway Park "is one of the most fabled drag strips in America, and it ranked among the country's top five tracks".

Raceway Park previously hosted the SuperNationals (later Summernationals) of the National Hot Rod Association for Funny Car and Top Fuel competitions, as well as other drag racing events. In January 2018, NHRA and Raceway Park officials announced that the venue will cease hosting all drag racing events due to rising costs. Areas specific to drag racing will be converted to outdoor concert space.  All other areas of the facility will remain operational, such as the drift track, go karts, motocross, etc.

As concert venue
On September 3, 1977, the Grateful Dead performed for a crowd of 107,019 at Raceway Park, becoming the largest ticketed concert in the United States to date. The show was recorded and released in album form as part of "Dick's Picks", a series of live albums, in 1999. The concert was the largest in the state's history. In 2017, Rolling Stone named the Raceway Park concert as part of the tour listed as one of the greatest of all time. 
The concert is celebrated and remembered fondly by band members and music enthusiasts alike. "I grew up in Englishtown, New Jersey, and as a child played in the green field where the concert took place. It was a blessing to join some 150,000 colorful people who attended the memorable show that summer day," said Jerry Garcia's wife, Manasha Garcia, president and co-founder of the Jerry Garcia Foundation." The Marshall Tucker Band and the New Riders of the Purple Sage performed as opening acts. In May 2018, the Englishtown Project, a New Jersey touring band was formed to the celebrate the legendary concert. The group was formed by guitarist and singer Michael Falzarano, formerly of the New Riders of the Purple Sage, and Hot Tuna.

Racing events

As of 2022, the two drag strips on the property are closed. Raceway Park no longer hosts drag racing events of any type.

The 1/8-mile track was the host of junior dragsters and "trophy" classes. The 1/4-mile track was the host of everything from street-driven vehicles to the quickest in the sport, the top fuel dragsters.

NHRA Mello Yello Drag Racing Series

Motocross
The riding surfaces on the practice motocross tracks are mostly soft loam, which is known to be one of the best surfaces for a nice ride, and are slightly angled to allow for drainage. The tracks are also regularly maintained to keep the jump faces, bowls, and whoops from rutting and cupping out. The tracks provide both long, straight paths for speed and challenging obstacles such as off cambers, banks, ledges, and ditches.

Drifting
Drifting is hosted by a company called ClubLoose; they have been running events there since 2002, which started off in the parking lot, but now take places only on the road course. With different classes ranging from introductory, intermediate, and the top level which allows tandeming with other drivers on the track simultaneously. Both the car and the equipment being used by every driver get inspected prior to being allowed to participate. Rear-wheel-drive cars are the only cars that will pass ClubLoose technical inspection.

Event schedule
Raceway Park offers a series of car shows, concerts, mud runs, motocross and swap meet events throughout their season. In the past every Wednesday and select Friday nights they had Time Trials where the track was open for anyone who would like to race their cars, bike, etc. for practice.

Incidents and accidents
 In June 2008, Nitro Funny Car driver Scott Kalitta was killed during NHRA Supernationals qualifying at the dragstrip.  
 In June 2010, Alcohol Funny Car driver Neal Parker was killed during NHRA Supernationals qualifying at the dragstrip.

See also

Atco Dragway

References

External links
Official Site

Buildings and structures in Middlesex County, New Jersey
Sports venues completed in 1965
Motorsport venues in New Jersey
Old Bridge Township, New Jersey
Tourist attractions in Middlesex County, New Jersey
1965 establishments in New Jersey